'The Fogg Dam Conservation Reserve''' is a protected area consisting of a wetland area approximately  east of Darwin in the Northern Territory of Australia. It lies within the Adelaide and Mary River Floodplains, which is an Important Bird Area.

It attracts a wide range of local and migratory water birds and other wildlife including one of the largest populations of snakes within Australia (including the Water Python and Death Adder), and includes several raised observation platforms.

Saltwater Crocodiles (Crocodylus porosus) and Freshwater Crocodiles (Crocodylus johnstoni) can be seen at Fogg Dam all year around.
Fogg Dam is open 24/7/365.

Species lists

References

Further reading

External links

 Fogg Dam Conservation Area official webpage
Webpage on the Protected Planet website
 Friends of Fogg Dam

Conservation reserves in the Northern Territory
1982 establishments in Australia
Protected areas established in 1982